The Abriaquí Fault is an oblique thrust fault in the department of Antioquia in northwestern Colombia.

Etymology 
The fault is named after Abriaquí.

Description 
The Abriaquí Fault parallels the Cañasgordas Fault to the south, cutting Cretaceous oceanic volcanic rocks as well as Tertiary and Cretaceous sedimentary rocks. The fault has a well defined fault trace with scarps, saddles, and deflected streams.

See also 

 List of earthquakes in Colombia
 Romeral Fault System

References

Bibliography

Maps

Further reading 
 

Seismic faults of Colombia
Thrust faults
Strike-slip faults
Inactive faults
Faults